TMF (The Music Factory) was a music video and entertainment channel in the United Kingdom and Ireland. The channel was owned by Viacom International Media Networks and was originally a Dutch channel. Formed after the two other TMF stations, which were based in mainland Europe, the channel was created to counter against EMAP's The Hits channel (now 4Music) on the new free-to-air digital terrestrial television service Freeview in 2002.

Upon launch, TMF's description was "TMF is designed to replicate the rhythms of the whole family, playing the best pop videos with the biggest pop stars to become the sound track to the British family life." However, it later broadened its content to air programming from its sister channels MTV, VH1, Nick Jr. and Comedy Central, so it no longer relied on just music videos.

TMF broadcast on Freeview, Sky and Virgin Media and as well as in some Irish cable packages. The channel was the most viewed music video related station in the UK, according to BARB ratings.

Shows on TMF

MTV/VH1 programming
TMF initially launched as a non-stop music channel, though from early 2004 it began to air programming from MTV and VH1:

 Beavis and Butt-head
 Made
 MTV Cribs
 Room Raiders
 Date My Mom
 Drawn Together
 The Fabulous Life of...
 My Fair Brady
 Hogan Knows Best
 The Surreal Life
 Dirty Sanchez
 Pimp My Ride
 Jackass
 My Super Sweet 16

Noggin
Noggin started broadcasting on 30 January 2006, the first international feed of Noggin (excluding the former vintage block on Nick Jr. which only had the name in common). It was a children's television slot broadcast on TMF from 07:00 to 09:00 daily. It showed a selection of Nick Jr shows and often promoted the full Nick Jr. channels to viewers with only Freeview. It was hosted by Moose A. Moose and Zee D. Bird from the American Noggin. 

It was relaunched in 2009 after replacing the former Nick Jr. on TMF block.  The final set of programmes shown were Go Diego Go!, Dora the Explorer, Little Bear, Bruno and Maggie and the Ferocious Beast.

Noggin was the first commercial children's television channel launched on 30 January 2006 on TMF to air on the UK's DTT platform, Freeview, followed by CITV, then lastly Playhouse Disney on ABC1.

Following the closure of TMF, the block continued on Viva until March 2010, when the Nick Jr. rebrand caused Noggin to shutdown. However, the branding of Noggin (except the name "Noggin") and the Moose and Zee segments were adopted by Nick Jr. and used until January 2013.

Nick Jr on TMF
Nick Jr on TMF had replaced the strand Noggin on 25 September 2005, but its programming remained identical. It is unknown why the rebrand happened, or why it reverted back to Noggin in 2009. It used the same ident and presentation package as its main sister channel, Nick Jr. Moose and Zee's segments were removed as well. Programmes shown included Peppa Pig, Maggie and the Ferocious Beast, Dora the Explorer, The Backyardigans, Thomas & Friends, Blue's Clues, LazyTown, Go Diego Go!, Little Bill amongst others.

Nickelodeon programming
Repeat airings of Nickelodeons UK Kids Choice Awards 2008 were scheduled on TMF and MTV Hits, in September 2008.

TMF had also aired SpongeBob SquarePants for a brief time in 2004 in late night hours.

Comedy Central programming
In January 2007 TMF began showing comedies broadcast on Paramount Comedy, in a strand entitled Comedy Classics. These included the likes of The Wonder Years, Ally McBeal and Cheers, as well as various Paramount films. During The Friday Movie strand, the channel's DOG changed to an enlarged version, with a re-arranged name displaying "TFM".

Original programming 
In August 2005, TMF commissioned two new shows called Pop the Q and Game One. In early 2006 came The Loaded Hour (a male-orientated themed show named after the magazine sponsor, fronted by Kate Edmondson), and in the summer a new live show called TMF Live (presented again by Edmondson, as well as TMF News anchor Carole Machin). With the exception of Pop the Q, none of the shows had a second series.

Replacement and closure

On 14 October 2009, MTV Networks announced plans to replace TMF with a new music and comedy channel. Viva replaced TMF on 26 October 2009.
The final music video that was shown on TMF was Whitney Houston's "Million Dollar Bill" at around 5:55 am on 26 October 2009. After this, the channel showed its Noggin children's strand, which aired since the launch of TMF. This then faded into a promo consisting of music videos at 9 am. The last video played on the promo programme Up Your Video was Cheryl Cole's "Fight For This Love" at about 3:55 pm on 26 October 2009.

See also
Viva (UK and Ireland)
MTV (UK & Ireland)
MTV Rocks
MTV Base
MTV Dance
MTV Hits

Notes

References

External links
TMF at MTV.co.uk

Music video networks in the United Kingdom
Paramount International Networks
Television channels and stations established in 2002
Television channels and stations disestablished in 2009
Defunct television channels in the United Kingdom
2002 establishments in the United Kingdom
2009 disestablishments in the United Kingdom
Television channel articles with incorrect naming style